Pterostylis mirabilis, commonly known as the nodding rufous-hood, is a plant in the orchid family Orchidaceae and is endemic to South Australia. It has a rosette of leaves at its base and up to ten greenish-white flowers with a narrow hood, down-turned lateral sepals and a thin-textured, insect-like labellum.

Description
Pterostylis mirabilis, is a terrestrial,  perennial, deciduous, herb with an underground tuber. Flowering plants have a rosette at the base of the flowering spike but the leaves are usually withered by flowering time.

Taxonomy and naming
This orchid was first formally described in 2007 by David Jones and given the name Oligochaetochilus mirabilis from a specimen collected near the road from Cowell to Kimba. The description was published in The Orchadian. In 2008, Robert Bates changed the name to Pterostylis mirabilis. The specific epithet (mirabilis) is a Latin word meaning "wonderful" or "strange".

Distribution and habitat
The nodding rufous-hood grows in rocky, hilly places, often under Melaleuca uncinata scrub. It is only known from about twelve locations on the Eyre Peninsula.

Conservation
Pterostylis mirabilis is listed as "vulnerable" under the Australian Government Environment Protection and Biodiversity Conservation Act 1999. The main threats to the species are habitat fragmentation, weed invasion, inappropriate fire regimes and agricultural practices.

References

mirabilis
Endemic orchids of Australia
Orchids of South Australia
Plants described in 1810